Watchers at the Strait Gate is a collection of stories by American writer Russell Kirk.  It was released in 1984 and was the author's second book published by Arkham House, and Kirk's third collection of supernatural stories.  It was published in an edition of 3,459 copies.

Contents

Watchers at the Strait Gate contains the following tales:

 "A Cautionary Note on the Ghostly Tale"
 "The Invasion of the Church of the Holy Ghost"
 "The Surly Sullen Bell"
 "The Peculiar Demesne of Archvicar Gerontion"
 "Uncle Isaiah"
 "The Reflex-Man in Whinnymuir Close"
 "What Shadows We Pursue"
 "Lex Talionis"
 "Fate's Purse"
 "An Encounter by Mortstone Pond"
 "Watchers at the Strait Gate"

Sources

1984 short story collections
Fantasy short story collections
Horror short story collections